Microsoft Corporation is a multinational corporation based in Redmond, Washington, USA and founded by Bill Gates and Paul Allen that develops, manufactures, licenses, and supports a wide range of products and services predominantly related to computing. Due to the scope and size of the company, it encompasses a broad range of topics mostly revolving around critical analysis and the company's products and services.

Lists
 List of investments by Microsoft Corporation
 List of mergers and acquisitions by Microsoft
 List of Control Panel applets (Windows)
 List of Games for Windows titles
 List of Macintosh software published by Microsoft
 List of Microsoft - Nortel (ICA) products
 List of Microsoft codenames
 List of Microsoft DOS versions
 List of DOS commands
 List of Microsoft Office programs
 List of Microsoft operating systems
 List of Microsoft software
 List of Microsoft server technology
 List of Microsoft Visual Studio add-ins
 List of Microsoft Windows components
 List of Microsoft Windows application programming interfaces and frameworks
 List of typefaces included with Microsoft Windows
 List of Microsoft Windows versions

Analysis
 Criticism of Microsoft
 Microsoft litigation
 Microsoft interview

Networking
 NetBEUI
 APIPA
 Internet Information Services

Events
 Build
 MIX
 PDC
 TechEd
 WinHEC

Devices
 Actimates − Set of toys (discontinued) developed by Microsoft.
 Pocket PC
 Microsoft Mouse
 Microsoft Natural keyboard
 Xbox
 Xbox
 Xbox 360
 Xbox One
 Xbox Series X/S
 Kinect
 UMPC
 SideWinder family
 Digital Sound System 80
 Microsoft Zune
 Microsoft Surface

Partnerships
 Virus Information Alliance – An international partnership created by the Microsoft Corporation in association with various antivirus vendors.
 Ultra Mobile PC − Joint specification by Microsoft and others for a small form factor tablet PC.
 Microsoft Partner Network - The Microsoft partner companies who build solutions on top of Microsoft software or who resell Microsoft software.

People

Board of Directors 
John W. Thompson (Chairperson)
Satya Nadella (CEO)
Dina Dublon
Raymond Gilmartin
Maria Klawe
David Marquardt
Charles Noski
Helmut Panke

Chief officers 
Satya Nadella (CEO)
Amy Hood (CFO)
Craig Mundie (CRSO)
Kevin Turner (COO)

Senior Leaders 
Tony Bates
Julie Larson-Green
Qi Lu
Terry Myerson
Satya Nadella
Mark Penn
Tami Reller

Presidents and VPs 
Joe Belfiore
Jon DeVaan (SVP)
Richard Rashid (SVP)
S. Somasegar (SVP)

Segments and subsidiaries 
 Microsoft Services Asia − A subsidiary responsible for services across Asia.
 Microsoft Studios − A division responsible for the creation of video content for Microsoft and its partners.
 Microsoft Research - A division responsible for the research of computer science.
 MSNBC - A television station formerly co-owned by Microsoft; Microsoft is still a shareholder.
 Slate - Current affairs magazine created by Microsoft and later sold to the Washington Post Company.
 Microsoft Skype Division  - A Division responsible for the Skype and Microsoft Lync products
 Microsoft hardware

Other
 Bliss (image)
 Microsoft and open source
 Shared Source Initiative

 Microsoft topics
Microsoft
Microsoft
Microsoft